Gulenia monicae is a species of sea slug, an aeolid nudibranch, a marine heterobranch mollusc in the family Flabellinidae.

Distribution
Gulenia monicae was described from specimens collected at 10–30 m depth at Gulen Dive Centre, Norway, Atlantic Ocean, .

References

Flabellinidae
Gastropods described in 2017